Martín Suárez may refer to:
 Martín Suárez (basketball)
 Martín Suárez (footballer)

See also
 Martín Suárez de Toledo, Spanish nobleman and conquistador